The following is a list of wars involving Senegal.

References 

Senegal
Wars
Wars involving Senegal